An M visa may refer to:

 M-1 visa, a type of visa for students who want to study in the United States
 M-2 visa, a type of visa for the dependents of an individual with an M-1 visa
 mVisa, a mobile payments system run by Visa Inc.